Gustave Chand Rudman Rambali is a Franco-Swedish composer, arranger and producer. Former singer and gutarist of the group Naast, he has arranged or produced music for artists such as Woodkid, The Weeknd, and Labrinth. He has since then composed original music for the award winning soundtrack of the HBO series Euphoria. In 2021, he composed the music for the documentary  which was selected at the 78th Venice International Film Festival and in 2022, he composed the original music for the haute couture shows of Balenciaga and Alaia at the Paris Fashion Week.

Biography
Rambali is the son of Paul Rambali, a British rock critic from NME and editor of The Face. He was born in Paris, France and began learning piano as a child at his local conservatory. Aged 20, he enrolled at the Schola Cantorum de Paris. From there, he was admitted to the Conservatoire National Supérieur de Musique et de Danse de Paris where he studied composition and orchestration. In 2013, he received from the CNSMDP the Prix d’harmonie, and in 2015 the Prix d’écriture XX-XXIème.

In 2004, as Gustave Naast, he formed the group Naast with members Jeff Brakha, Nicolas Ballay and Lucas Sensi. His song Mauvais Garçon from their debut album Antichambre was featured in the video game Guitar Hero III: Legends of Rock. In 2008, he disbanded the group to pursue his classical music studies. Later in the year, he composed the music for the animated children's TV series Podcats.

In 2011, his arrangement of the song Iron by Woodkid marked his career debut as an arranger and producer. The arrangement was later sampled by Kendrick Lamar for The Spiteful Chant. Whilst continuing his studies, he composed, arranged or produced music for artists including Clean Bandit, The Weeknd, Birdy and LSD (a supergroup comprising Labrinth, Sia and Diplo). In 2015, he did arrangements for Losers on The Weeknd's Grammy award-winning album, Beauty Behind The Madness.

In 2017, he composed the soundtrack of Atacama, a short film directed by French contemporary artist Caroline Corbasson. In 2019, he composed music for the HBO series Euphoria, directed by Sam Levinson. In 2021, he composed the original soundtrack for the documentary Tranchées which had its out of category world premiere at 78th Venice International Film Festival. In 2022, he was invited by fashion brands Balenciaga and Alaia to compose the music for their haute couture shows at the Paris Fashion Week.

Discography

References

French composers
Swedish composers
Kendrick Lamar
The Weeknd
Year of birth missing (living people)
Living people